Xu Hong (born May 14, 1968, in Dalian) is a retired Chinese football player and football manager. He was most recently the manager of Chinese Super League team Dalian Aerbin F.C. for 63 days before he had to resign on February 19, 2013, because it was discovered by the Chinese Football Association that he manipulated a match while as a manager at Sichuan Guancheng and was given a 5-year suspension from all football activity.

Playing career
Xu Hong rose to prominence in the 1994 league season with Dalian Wanda FC, when they won the first professional Chinese Jia-A League title. With Dalian, he would win several more top-tier league titles in his career in a dominant Dalian team. As one of the most consistent members of the Dalian team he was also named in several senior Chinese national teams, captaining his country against England in 1996.

Management career
After he retired, Xu Hong began managing the newly formed Chinese team Dalian Sidelong in the third tier. He quickly managed to get them immediately promoted to the second tier in 2002 and was able to take  Dalian Sidelong second in the league. However the Chinese Football Association, in there attempt to improve the league system did not allow any promotion or relegation in this season and Dalian Sidelong remained in the same league.

Xu Hong caught the attention of top-tier team Sichuan Guancheng in the 2003 league season where he took them eighth and then ninth the following season in the league. These unremarkable performances saw Xu Hong leave at the end of the 2004 league season. He would not work in management until the 2006 league season with consistent relegation contenders Chongqing Lifan F.C., however despite his best efforts his reign at Chongqing was extremely disappointing and they were relegated at the end of the season, which saw the immediate departure of Xu Hong.

Despite being out of management for two seasons Xu Hong's ties were strong enough for him to be given the assistant post at Dalian Shide F.C. in 2008 to Milorad Kosanović. However Milorad Kosanović left as Head Coach after a very disappointing season which saw them fight against relegation. Xu Hong was brought in as a temporary Head Coach, yet impressed many at the end of the season with his coaching skills and was offered a permanent position. His resignation was accepted after a 1–2 home loss against Tianjin Teda on May 15, 2010.

Match fixing

On February 19, 2013, Xu was given a 5-year suspension from all football activity after it was discovered by the Chinese Football Association that he manipulated a match while he was manager of Sichuan Guancheng. The match in question was the league game between Sichuan Guancheng against Shaanxi Guoli F.C. on September 21, 2003, in a game that Sichuan actually won 5–1. The Chinese FA claim that the General manager of Shaanxi Guoli, Wang Po told Xu to manipulate the game, however Xu has gone on to proclaim his innocence by pointing out that his team actually won the game and that he never received a penny from Wang Po who has already received a life-ban from football.

Honours

Player
Chinese Jia-A League: 1994, 1996, 1997, 1998, 2000

Manager
China League Two: 2001

References

External links
 Profile at Sina

1968 births
Living people
Chinese football managers
Chinese footballers
Footballers from Dalian
China international footballers
Liaoning F.C. players
Dalian Shide F.C. players
1992 AFC Asian Cup players
1996 AFC Asian Cup players
Dalian Shide F.C. managers
Dalian Professional F.C. managers
Chongqing Liangjiang Athletic F.C. managers
Asian Games silver medalists for China
Medalists at the 1994 Asian Games
Asian Games medalists in football
Association football defenders
Footballers at the 1994 Asian Games